-ana (variant: -iana) is a Latin-origin suffix that is used in English to convert nouns—usually proper names—into mass nouns, most commonly in order to refer to a collection of things, facts, stories, memorabilia, and anything else, that relate to a specific place, period, person, etc.

For instance, Americana is used to refer to things that are distinctive of the US, while Canadiana is for Canada; in literature, Shakespeareana and Dickensiana are similarly used in reference to items or stories related to William Shakespeare or Charles Dickens, respectively.

The suffix -ana, -iana, or -eana have also often been used in the titles of musical works, as a way for a composer to pay tribute to an earlier composer or noted performer.

History and lexicology 
The suffix has been around since at least the 16th century, typically in book titles, with the first recorded use of -ana being between 1720 and 1730.

The recognition of the usage of -ana or -iana as a self-conscious literary construction, on the other hand, traces back to at least 1740, when it was mentioned in an edition of Scaligerana, a collection of table talk of Joseph Justus Scaliger, from around 150 years previously. By that period, Scaliger was described as "the father, so to speak, of all those books published under the title of -ana."

As grammatical construction, it is the neuter plural, nominative form of an adjective. So, from Scaliger is formed first the adjective Scaligeranus (Scaligeran), which is then put into the form of an abstract noun, Scaligerana (Scaligeran things). In Americana, a variant construction, the adjectival form already exists as Americanus, so it is simply a neuter plural (suffix –a on the stem American-); the case of Victoriana (things associated with the Victorian period) is superficially similar, but the Latin adjective form is Dog Latin.

Derived terms

Places 

 Africana — things relating to Africa
 Americana — things relating to the United States
 Californiana — things relating to the state of California
 Floridiana — things relating to the state of Florida.
 Hawaiiana — things relating to the state of Hawaii and cultural artifacts of Native Hawaiians.
 Australiana — things relating to Australia
 Canadiana — things relating to Canada
 Filipiniana — things relating to the Philippines
 Kiwiana — things relating to New Zealand
 Rhodesiana — things relating to Rhodesia

Literature 
 Bondiana — items relating to James Bond. 
Dickensiana — items or stories related to Charles Dickens
Forteana — things related to Charles Fort or anomalous phenomena
Johnsoniana — the sayings or writings of Samuel Johnson
Miltoniana — items or stories related to John Milton
Shakespeareana —  items or stories related to William Shakespeare.
Sherlockiana — a broad term relating to memorabilia and non-canonical works of fiction about or referring to the fictional detective Sherlock Holmes
Thraliana — the name of a diary kept by Hester Thrale

Other

Absinthiana – accoutrements related to absinthe and its preparation. 
Arthuriana — things relating to King Arthur and Arthurian literature.
Breweriana — collectables associated with a brewery or one of its brands, including beer cans, caps bottles, labels, mats, trays, and taps, as well as bottle openers, tin signs, and neon signs.
Disneyana — items related to The Walt Disney Company, including collectibles, souvenirs, ephemera, and other items produced and/or licensed by Disney.
Mozartiana — things relating to Wolfgang Amadeus Mozart.
Petroliana — collectibles relating to gas stations or the petroleum industry, including such items as old gas pumps, fuel advertisements, enamel or tin signs, oil cans, and road maps. (See also Automobilia)
Railroadiana (or railwayana) — artifacts of currently- or formerly-operating railways.
Tobacciana — things relating to tobacco, smoking, and the tobacco industry
Trumpiana — materials or documents relating to Donald Trump 
Victoriana — items from or related to the Victorian era.

Usage

In literature
In 1718, Charles Gildon subtitled The Complete Art of Poetry with "Shakespeariana; or the most beautiful topicks, descriptions, and similes that occur throughout all Shakespear's plays."

In 1728, Jonathan Smedley had a work titled Gulliveriana: or a Fourth Volume of Miscellanies, being a sequel of the three volumes published by Pope and Swift, to which is added Alexanderiana, or a comparison between the ecclesiastical and poetical Popes and many things in verse and prose relating to the latter.

In 1842, John Wilson Croker, in reference to Samuel Johnson, published Johnsoniana: or, Supplement to Boswell.

Referring to John Milton, C. A. Moore titled a 1927 paper as "Miltoniana (1679–1741)".

In music
The suffix -iana, -eana or -ana has often been used in the titles of musical works, as a way of a composer paying a tribute to an earlier composer or a noted performer.

Mauro Giuliani (died 1829) wrote six sets of variations for guitar on themes by Gioachino Rossini, Opp. 119–124. Each set was called "Rossiniana", and collectively they are called Rossiniane.

See also

 Memorabilia
Automobilia
Militaria
Murderabilia
Composer tributes (classical music)

References

ana
Dog Latin words and phrases
 
Memorabilia
Collecting